Comic Festival (also known as Comics Festival UK) was a British comic book convention which was held annually in Bristol between 1999 and 2004. It was devised and produced by Kev F. Sutherland with the help of Mike Allwood of Area 51 Comics. 

The presentation of the National Comics Awards was a regular feature of Comic Festival from 1999 to 2003 (except for the year 2000, when the Eagle Awards were presented there). Charity auctions were held every year at the festival, first for Comic Relief and then for the benefit of ChildLine.

History
Comic Festival was preceded as an annual British comic convention by the United Kingdom Comic Art Convention, held annually (usually in London) from 1985 to 1998. By 1999, the comics audience in the UK was in decline; Comic Festival's aim was to reach non-comic readers, children, and families, and to enable them to enter the event at the cheapest possible prices. Once inside the convention, the audience would then be exposed to the widest range of comics material, thus building the readership of the future.

The festival began under the name Comics 99. 

In addition to the annual Bristol-based Comic Festival, secondary events were held in London in the fall of 2003 and 2004.

Comic Festival was succeeded as an annual convention by the Bristol-based Comic Expo, which began in 2004 and lasted until 2014.

Charity auctions 
For Comics 99, Sutherland produced The World's Biggest Comic, which featured the work of 100 of the world's leading comic artists, auctioned to raise money for the British charity Comic Relief. 

Subsequent projects, for the benefit of ChildLine, included the Charity Deck of Cards which, in 2001, raised over £10,000 through the auctioning of the original art and sales of the limited edition decks. The Just 1 Page charity comic was produced at Comic Festival, beginning in 2001 (and then continuing on at Comic Expo).

Locations and dates

London Comic Festival locations and dates

References

Footnotes

Sources consulted

External links 

1999 establishments in England
2004 disestablishments in England
British fan conventions
Defunct comics conventions
Comics conventions
Recurring events established in 1999